The Gramercy Riffs is a Canadian indie rock band formed in St. John's in 2008.  The band is in rotation on CBC Radio. The band was the recipient of the 2010 Atlantis Music Prize for their debut LP It's Heartbreak.  The album also received a positive review from Exclaim!.

History

Origin 
The Gramercy Riffs formed in 2008 in St. John's, Newfoundland and Labrador, Canada.  The band took their name from the 1979 film The Warriors. As of late 2009, the band has relocated to Toronto.

It's Heartbreak 
The band's debut LP It's Heartbreak was self-released 21 May 2010. The album earned the band a 2010 Atlantis Music Prize. The album also received a favourable review from Exclaim! magazine.

Band members 
Lee Hanlon – vocals, guitar (2008–present)
Mara Pellerin – vocals, keyboard (2008–present)
Daniel Banoub – bass guitar (2008–present)
Jimmy Rose – guitar (2009–present)
Brad Kilpatrick – drums (2010–present)
Adrian Collins – guitar (2008–2010)
James March – drums (2008–2010)

Discography

Albums 
2010 It's Heartbreak
2014 Desire Trails

Track listing

See also 

List of bands from Canada

References 

Musical groups established in 2008
Musical groups from St. John's, Newfoundland and Labrador
Canadian indie rock groups